Sir Ralph Frederic Howell (25 May 1923 – 14 February 2008) was a British farmer and Conservative Party politician.  He served as Member of Parliament (MP) for North Norfolk for 27 years.

Early life
Howell was born in Great Moulton in Norfolk, the son of a farmer.  He was educated at Diss Grammar School, Norfolk.  He joined the RAF in 1941, becoming a navigator and bomb aimer.  He was demobilised as a flight lieutenant in 1946, and became an arable farmer, later chairing the local branch of the National Farmers Union.

He married Margaret Bone in 1950.  His wife died in 2005.  He was survived by their daughter and two sons.

Political career
He joined the Conservative Party, and was councillor for Mitford and Launditch Rural District Council from 1961.  He stood for Parliament in North Norfolk at the 1966 general election, but could not displace the incumbent Labour MP, Bert Hazell.  He won the seat at the 1970 general election, and his assiduous constituency work enabled him to retain the seat for the next 27 years with increasing majorities.

His politics were considered to fall on the right wing of his party, supporting compulsory National Service, reintroduction of the death penalty, tax cuts, reduction of the public sector, stronger controls on immigration rules, and the introduction of identity cards.  He was a proponent of the adoption of a "workfare" system of unemployment benefits, to encourage unemployed people to find jobs.  His book, Why Work?, was published in 1976, followed by Why Not Work? (1991) and Putting Britain Back to Work (1995).  He served on several backbench committees, and on the executive of the 1922 Committee from 1984 to 1990.  In 1996, he introduced the Right to Work Bill, which proposed the state as the employer of last resort for the unemployed.

Howell was a nominated member of the European Parliament from 1974 to 1979, and a delegate to the Council of Europe and the Western European Union from 1987 to 1997.  He was knighted in 1993.  His elder son, Paul Howell, was elected as an MEP for Norfolk from 1979 to 1994.

He retired from the House of Commons at the 1997 general election.  His seat was retained by the Conservative David Prior, the son of one of Howell's internal political opponents, "wet" former Conservative cabinet minister Jim Prior.

References

Times Guide to the House of Commons, Times Newspapers Limited, 1992 edition.
Obituary, The Daily Telegraph, 17 February 2008
Obituary, The Independent, 23 February 2008
Obituary, The Times, 28 February 2008
 Obituary, The Guardian, 5 March 2008

External links 
 

1923 births
2008 deaths
Conservative Party (UK) MPs for English constituencies
UK MPs 1970–1974
UK MPs 1974
UK MPs 1974–1979
UK MPs 1979–1983
UK MPs 1983–1987
UK MPs 1987–1992
UK MPs 1992–1997
Knights Bachelor
Councillors in Norfolk
Conservative Party (UK) MEPs
MEPs for the United Kingdom 1973–1979
People educated at Diss Grammar School
Royal Air Force officers
Royal Air Force personnel of World War II
Politicians awarded knighthoods